Kuttumukku is a ward of Thrissur Municipal Corporation situated in the north-east side of the Corporation. It is a residential area with only a few institutions of importance.

Some institutions located in Kuttumukku

Vimala College, a first grade women's college under the CMC Management, affiliated to University of Calicut and established in 1967.
Kuttumukku Siva temple, a temple dedicated to Shiva and worshipped as Kiratha Moorthy.
Sandeepani Vidya Nikethan is a private school managed by the Thiruvambady Devaswom at Thrissur and started in the year 2002.
Kasthurbha smaraka vayanasala
50 year's of old library.

Kuttumukk Paddy Field..

Inside the Thrissur corporation we have only the largest paddy Field is situates in Kuttumukk.

Cherumukk sreekrishna temple 
List of Thrissur Corporation wards

References

Suburbs of Thrissur city